Love Crime is a 2010 French psychological suspense thriller directed by Alain Corneau.

Love Crime or Love Crimes may also refer to:
"Love Crime" (song), 2015 song by Siouxsie
Love Crimes (album), 2000 debut album by American R&B duo Ruff Endz
"Love Crime", a song by Westlife from World of Our Own
Love Crimes, 2016 album by American Armenian DJ Super Sako
Love Crimes (film), 1992 thriller film directed by Lizzie Borden
"Love Crimes", a song by Hayden Thorpe from Diviner

See also
"If Love Was a Crime", song by Bulgarian singer Poli Genova
"Love Is a Crime",song by American pop singer Anastacia
Love Crimes of Kabul, 2011 documentary film following select cases of inmates at Badam Bagh women's prison in Kabul, Afghanistan